Nippoptilia spinosa is a moth of the family Pterophoridae that is known from Papua New Guinea.

References

External links
Papua Insects

Platyptiliini
Moths described in 1963
Endemic fauna of Papua New Guinea